Lacus Bonitatis (Latin bonitātis, "Lake of Goodness") is a small lunar mare that lies to the northwest of the prominent crater Macrobius. Further to the north of Lacus Bonitatis is the Montes Taurus mountain range.

This mare is an irregular region of basaltic lava with uneven borders. The mare lies within a diameter of 122 km and the longest dimension trends from the southwest to the northeast.

See also
Volcanism on the Moon

References

Bonitatis, Lacus